Events from the year 1987 in the Socialist Republic of Romania.

Events

February

May
25-27 May – Mikhail Gorbachev visits Romania.

October

November

15 November – The Brașov rebellion takes places, where workers from the Steagul Roșu plant of Brașov and the Brașov Tractor plant are marching and chanting the  anthem Deșteaptă-te, române!.

References

External links